"Stern des Südens" is a song written by German songwriter  , and it is the club anthem sung during games at FC Bayern Munich's home stadium, the Allianz Arena. Its title in English means "Star of the South". It has been translated into twelve languages.

References

Football songs and chants
FC Bayern Munich